In enzymology, a phenol 2-monooxygenase is an enzyme that catalyzes the chemical reaction

phenol + NADPH + H+ + O2  catechol + NADP+ + H2O

The 4 substrates of this enzyme are phenol, NADPH, H+, and O2, whereas its 3 products are catechol, NADP+, and H2O.

This enzyme belongs to the family of oxidoreductases, specifically those acting on paired donors, with O2 as oxidant and incorporation or reduction of oxygen. The oxygen incorporated need not be derived from O2 with NADH or NADPH as one donor, and incorporation of one atom o oxygen into the other donor.  The systematic name of this enzyme class is phenol,NADPH:oxygen oxidoreductase (2-hydroxylating). Other names in common use include phenol hydroxylase, and phenol o-hydroxylase.  This enzyme participates in 3 metabolic pathways: gamma-hexachlorocyclohexane degradation, toluene and xylene degradation, and naphthalene and anthracene degradation.  It employs one cofactor, FAD.

Structural studies

References

 
 
 

EC 1.14.13
NADPH-dependent enzymes
Flavoproteins
Enzymes of known structure